The following is a list of all team-to-team transactions that have occurred in the National Hockey League during the 2014–15 NHL season. It lists which team each player has been traded to, signed by, or claimed by, and for which player(s) or draft pick (s), if applicable. Players who have retired are also listed. The 2014–15 trade deadline was on March 2, 2015. Any players traded or claimed off waivers after this date were eligible to play up until, but not in the 2015 Stanley Cup playoffs.

Retirement

Contract terminations 
At any time, a team and a player can mutually agree to terminate a player's contract.

For more details on contract terminations:

Teams may buy out player contracts (after the conclusion of a season) for a portion of the remaining value of the contract, paid over a period of twice the remaining length of the contract. This reduced number and extended period is applied to the cap hit as well.
If the player was under the age of 26 at the time of the buyout the player's pay and cap hit will reduced by a factor of 2/3 over the extended period.
If the player was 26 or older at the time of the buyout the player's pay and cap hit will reduced by a factor of 1/3 over the extended period.
If the player was 35 or older at the time of signing the contract the player's pay will be reduced by a factor of 1/3, but the cap hit will not be reduced over the extended period.

All players must clear waivers before having a contract terminated. Injured players cannot be bought out.

† - Following the 2012–13 NHL lockout each team was granted two compliance buyouts (to be exercised after the 2012–13 season and/or after the 2013–14 season) that would not count against the salary cap in any further year, regardless of the player's age. After using a compliance buyout on a player, that player is prohibited from rejoining the team that bought him out for one year; the NHL deemed that the re-signing of a player following a trade and a subsequent compliance buyout would be ruled as cap circumvention.

Free agency 
Note: This does not include players who have re-signed with their previous team as an unrestricted free agent or as a restricted free agent.

Imports
This section is for players who were not previously on contract with NHL teams in the past season. Listed is their previous team and the league that they belonged to.

Trades
* Retained Salary Transaction: Each team is allowed up to three contracts on their payroll where they have retained salary in a trade (i.e. the player no longer plays with Team A due to a trade to Team B, but Team A still retains some salary). Only up to 50% of a player's contract can be kept, and only up to 15% of a team's salary cap can be taken up by retained salary. A contract can only be involved in one of these trades twice.

June

July

October

November

December

January

February

March

June (2015)

Waivers 
Once an NHL player has played in a certain number of games or a set number of seasons has passed since the signing of his first NHL contract (see here), that player must be offered to all of the other NHL teams before he can be assigned to a minor league affiliate.

Staff compensation 
NHL teams will receive compensation for losing a coach, general manager or president of hockey operations to another team while they are still under contract. Teams will receive a second-round draft pick if a transaction happens during the season and a third-round pick if one occurs in the off-season (a coach's season ends when his team is eliminated from the playoffs, while seasons for GMs and presidents of hockey operations finish after the conclusion of the NHL Draft in June). Teams will have a three-year window to choose from when to lose their draft pick.

See also
2014–15 NHL season
2014 NHL Entry Draft
2015 NHL Entry Draft
2016 NHL Entry Draft
2014 in sports
2015 in sports
2013–14 NHL transactions
2015–16 NHL transactions

References

External links
TSN transactions
Official NHL Free Agent signings
The Hockey News transactions
Elite Prospects Confirmed Transfers

Transactions
National Hockey League transactions